Little fresh meat is a Chinese Internet buzzword used to describe handsome young men. It is most commonly used to refer to male celebrities, particularly rising stars.

Positive impact

Star power and commercial value 
This term has been widely used as a selling point by Chinese entertainment agencies in defining a star, and often helps the star in gaining more fans.

Box office 
Films featuring "little fresh meat" have done well at the box office, in return for some of these films' low production cost. This is due to the devout fanbase of the stars. In particular, the media coined Lu Han's massive influence among his followers as the Lu Han effect, which helped achieve high ratings for the television drama Fighter of the Destiny in spite of poor reviews from critics.

Diversification of label 
The popularity of "little fresh meat" have allowed the media to create new representations of male beauty on screen, thus diversifying the type of characters portrayed by actors in television and films. Males who possess delicate and feminine features are no longer met with contempt or ridicule.

Negative criticism

Astronomically high salaries 

It has been reported that the high salaries demanded by some "little fresh meats" have caused a detrimental impact on film profits.
The movies Somewhere Only We Know (2015) and Sweet Sixteen (2016) were highly dependent on leading actor Kris Wu's idol appeal. Yet while the first film grossed 286 million yuan, the latter dropped to 149 million.
L.O.R.D: Legend of Ravaging Dynasties, which amassed some of the biggest names like Kris Wu, TFBoys, and William Chan, grossed only 382 million out of the forecasted 2 billion.

Unprofessional attitude 
Some of the "little fresh meats" have often been criticized for their lack of acting skills, causing their films to receive negative reviews and online backlash. Li Yifeng was panned for not mastering the Beijing dialect for his role in Mr. Six, and received criticism for winning the Best Supporting Actor award at the Hundred Flowers Awards, which sparked a "Popularity vs Talent" controversy.

Other common unprofessional behaviour exhibited by "little fresh meats" include getting stand-ins to replace them in certain shots. Due to their popularity, they also tend to juggle multiple projects and don't give adequate time for each role, instead hiring stand-in look-alikes to replace them in shots that do not require close ups.

Quality 
Mr. Six received critical acclaim and won the Best Actor award for leading man Feng Xiaogang but received criticism for Li Yifeng and Kris Wu's acting.
Time Raiders, based on the popular novel Daomu Biji and featuring Chinese heartthrobs Jing Boran and Lu Han, earned 1 billion yuan at the box office but received overwhelming negative reviews from critics in China.
The People's Liberation Army Daily criticized the unrealistic portrayals by some of these young actors in military-themed films.
Recent movies with Jackie Chan like Vanguard, The Knight of Shadows: Between Yin and Yang, Kung Fu Yoga and Railroad Tigers have been criticized for the overuse of young actors. Jackie Chan has also criticized the behavior of some of these young actors.

In the media

Empowerment on women 
The phenomenon has contributed to the rise of girl power. Women have always been used as an object of appreciation, but now men are also receiving the same treatment. Feminist Lü Pin said: "I think the phrase is a symbol for the possibility of diversification. In the past the mainstream was old men [dating] young women, but now matches of people of different ages are being accepted."

As the term "little fresh meat" has been used by women to express their desire/hunger for young, good-looking men, a psychologist stated that it is a progress for women to recognize their sexual needs and self-gratification in the otherwise restrained society in China.

Comments by entertainers 

Chinese Swimmer Ning Zetao said that he wouldn't want to be called a piece of little fresh meat. "I don't like this nametag," he said.

Commercial trends 

The popularity of the "little fresh meat" has also resulted in a change in beauty and cosmetic companies, which have increasingly begun to use young male celebrities to endorse their products instead of female celebrities.

People associated with the title 

William Chan (born 1985), singer and actor
Li Yifeng (born 1987), singer and actor
Jing Boran (born 1989), singer and actor
Lu Han (born 1990), singer and actor
Chen Xuedong (born 1990), singer and actor
Kris Wu (born 1990), singer and actor
Yang Yang (born 1991), singer and actor
Zhang Yixing (born 1991), singer and actor
Oho Ou (born 1992), Actor
Huang Zitao (born 1993), singer and actor
Ning Zetao (born 1993), athlete
Cai Xukun (born 1998), singer
Liu Haoran (born 1997), actor
Leo Wu (born 1999), actor
TFBoys, boy band
Xiao Zhan (born 1991), actor, singer
Wang Yibo (born 1997), actor, singer, dancer, motorcycle rider
Li Zhenning (born 1995), actor, singer

See also 
 Kkonminam

References 

Chinese slang